Tosca Musk (born July 20, 1974) is a South African filmmaker. She is an executive producer and director of feature films, television programs, and web content. Her work includes K. Bromberg's Driven, Rachel van Dyken's Matchmaker's Playbook, and  her web series, Tiki Bar TV. Tosca is the younger sister of Elon Musk and Kimbal Musk,  and daughter of Errol Musk and Maye Musk. She co-founded the streaming service Passionflix.

Early life and education
Musk was born in South Africa and grew up in Johannesburg with her two older brothers: Kimbal and Elon. In 1979, her parents, Errol and Maye Musk, divorced. In 1981, Elon moved to live with his father; four years later, Kimbal did so as well. After graduating from high school, Elon moved to Canada; six months later, in 1989, Maye also moved to Canada with Tosca.

Tosca Musk graduated from the University of British Columbia with a BFA degree in film studies in 1997.

Career 
Musk produced and directed her first feature film, Puzzled, in 2001 with Musk Entertainment. Elon Musk was the film's executive producer. Soon thereafter, Musk produced the feature film, The Truth About Miranda, since followed by over a dozen features, television movies and series, including the teen horror film, Cruel World, the UK feature, The Heavy and the television drama, We Have Your Husband. In 2011, Musk produced three more television movies which aired on Lifetime and Hallmark in early 2012.

In 2005, Tosca Musk partnered with Jeff Macpherson to produce the web series, Tiki Bar TV. That same year, during the Macworld 2005 Keynote presentation (which introduced the iPod with Video) Steve Jobs showcased Tiki Bar TV to the audience as an example of a video podcast (a relatively new media format at the time) which could be loaded to the new video iPod using Apple's iTunes software.

Tiki Bar TV has been featured in Wired magazine, as well as in other media outlets. In July 2006, the show was featured in a profile on Jeff Macpherson in Forbes magazine's Celebrity 100 Issue as "one of the first breakout stars in the world of Internet television".

Musk is the CEO and co-founder of the OTT streaming platform Passionflix, which The New York Times describes as "sexy Hallmark Channel." Developed in 2017 with writer Joany Kane and producer Jina Panebianco, Passionflix makes movies out of romance novels. As of 2022, it charges customers $6 per month for its service and it had raised $22 million in funding. Tosca has directed several feature films for the platform including Alessandra Torre's Hollywood Dirt, Sylvia Day's Afterburn/Aftershock, Rachel van Dyken's The Matchmaker's Playbook, K. Bromberg's Driven, Jodi Ellen Malpas' The Protector, and Sylvain Reynard's Gabriel's Inferno series.

Awards and recognition

References

External links 

American film producers
American women film directors
Living people
South African emigrants to the United States
University of British Columbia alumni
Canadian women film producers
South African film producers
Canadian women film directors
Place of birth missing (living people)
South African people of Canadian descent
Canadian people of South African descent
1974 births
Canadian people of British descent
South African people of British descent
American people of British descent
South African people of German descent
Canadian people of German descent
American people of Pennsylvania Dutch descent
American women film producers
Musk family
21st-century American women